Kamal Chaudhry (born 3 July 1947) is an Indian Politician. His Father Chaudhry Balbir Singh was a Prominent political and Social figure and Served as the Member of Parliament and MLA from Hoshiarpur on Multiple Occasions his father was Referred as  Shere Punjab  he was Assassinated by Khalistani extremists in 1985 he was Member of the Socialist party of India . His brother Mohan Chaudhry died in a road accident in Canada his younger brother Ravi Chaudhry is a retired Merchant Navy officer one of his son died when he fell from the  terrace while flying  kite his wife elder son and daughter lives in Delhi Kamal Chaudhary currently resides  in Hoshiarpur at his farm house.

Political career
Elected Member of Parliament (Lok Sabha)-4 times. 1985,1989,1991,1998.

Chairman Committee on Public Undertaking 1995–96.

Chairman Standing Committee on Defence 1998–99.

Member Joint Parliamentary Committee looking into Bank Scam.

Member Joint Parliamentary Committee looking into Bofors Gun Deal.

Fighter Pilot in the Indian Air Force.

PARLIAMENTARY COMMITTEES- MEMBER

Estimates Committee.

Public Accounts Committee.

Consultative Committee, Ministry of Defence.

Consultative Committee, Ministry of Home Affairs.

Committee on Science and Technology.

Advisory Committee on Forest and Environment.

Central Executive Committee, N.C.C., Ministry of Defence.

General Purpose Committee Lok Sabha.

Northern Railway Zonal Advisory Committee.

Elected Secretary Congress Party in Parliament 1990-91

Chairman All India Ex- Servicemen Congress 1992-97

Founder Chairman of Permanent Control Room in AICC.

EDUCATIONAL MANAGEMENT

Member of Panjab University Senate: 1987-95 (8 years).

Member of Panjab University Syndicate 1989–91.

Remained President of DAV College Managing Committee for 20 Years running 25 School/ Colleges in Panjab, Rajasthan & Haryana. He was Instrumental in Establishing DAV College Hoshiarpur as one of the best Educational institute in Punjab.

EDUCATIONAL RECORD

National Defence Academy Khadakwasla, Poona.

Pilot Training Establishment, Bidar, Karnataka.

Air Force Flying College, Jodhpur.

Fighter Training Wing, Secunderabad.

Qualified Flying Instructor in IAF 1975-85 (11 years).

Qualified Forward Air Controller.

Mig 23 Training in USSR 1982.

Fighter Bomber Medical Indoctrination Course, I.A.M. Bangalore.

Flight Safety Course.

Qualified Instructor in Jungle and Snow Survival.

SPORTS ACHIEVEMENTS

Vice Chairman of Common Wealth Games Queen's Baton Relay.

President of Punjab Swimming Association for 5 years.

President of Punjab Boxing Association for 2 years.

Founder President of Uttaranchal Pradesh Hockey Association.

President of Karatedo Association since 1986.

President of Hoshiarpur Boxing Association since 1986.

Member of Punjab Olympic Association.

Chairman of Lal Bahadur Shastri Hockey Tournament Committee since 1990 conducting International Tournaments.

Actively participated in 14 Games / Sports in Panjab University, National Defence Academy and in the Indian Air Force.

Sports Captain in various establishments.

Performing Yoga for more than 60 years. Gave a Yoga demonstration in Armed Forces Medical College, Poona in 1966.

SPECIAL ACHIEVEMENTS

Escorted Prime Minister, Rajiv Gandhi in a MIG 23 Fighter Aircraft, Nov 1984.

Carried Out Sensitive Operational Mission Escorting Photo Reccee Bombers

Raised a "New MIG 23 Fighter Squadron" conducted all Live Firing Trials.

Converting a full MIG 21 Squadron to MIG 21 BIS- Single handed.

Flight Commander of the latest Fighter Interceptor Squadron, Indian Air Force

Adjutant of an Operational Fighter Squadron in I.A.F.

Handled Various Other Administrative, Operational and Sensitive Assignments in the IAF and also inside and outside the Parliament.

Founder Chairman of NRI Institute in the country.

Chief Patron of National Ex-Servicemen Co-ordination Committee since 1985.

President of Arya Samaj Hoshiarpur.

Chairman, India-Pakistan Co-operation Council.

Commendation by Chief of Air Staff on 26 January 1978.

Traveled in more than 25 countries on important assignments.

References

External links
Official biographical sketch in Parliament of India website

1947 births
Living people
People from Hoshiarpur
Arya Samajis
Indian National Congress politicians
Bharatiya Janata Party politicians from Punjab
Lok Sabha members from Punjab, India
India MPs 1984–1989
India MPs 1989–1991
India MPs 1991–1996
India MPs 1998–1999